The twinspots are a group of birds placed in four genera of the family Estrildidae:

Hypargos
Clytospiza, the brown twinspot, Clytospiza monteiri
Mandingoa, the green-backed twinspot, Mandingoa nitidula 
Euschistospiza